Hawise may refer to:

Hawise, Duchess of Brittany (ca. 1037–1072), hereditary Duchess of Brittany from 1066 until her death
Hawise of Normandy (died 1034), Countess of Rennes, Duchess of Brittany and Regent to her son Alan III, Duke of Brittany
Hawise of Chester, 1st Countess of Lincoln (1180–ca. 1242), Anglo-Norman noblewoman and  heiress
Hawise of Monmouth (fl. early 12th century), wife of William fitzBaderon
Hawise, Countess of Aumale (died 1214), daughter and heiress of William, Count of Aumale